Andiva ivantsovi is a Vendian fossil, identified to be a bilaterian triploblastic animal in the Ediacaran phylum Proarticulata, known from the Winter Coast, White Sea, Russia. It was first discovered in 1977, and described as a new species in a new genus by Mikhail Fedonkin in 2002. It lived about 555 million years ago. Fossils of Andiva also occur in South Australia. All known fossils of Andiva are external molds.

Description

The anterior part features a smooth "fringe" followed by a surface "covered by fine ribs and sutura", also described as a "quilt" with narrow, tightly packed chambers  The symmetry of these ribs is a glide symmetry, that is, in which the corresponding segments on the left and right sides do not line up, but are staggered. This is a feature shared by other forms belonging to the proposed taxon Proarticulata.

The original reconstruction by Fedonkin proposed that the ridged surface was a convex, thin carapace made of a chitin-like, non mineralized substance, protecting the animal while "creeping or gliding" over the sea bed. In the same reconstruction, the smooth zone was considered an imprint of the soft tissue beneath the dorsal carapace.

Association
Andiva is often found together with other species from the Ediacara biota, like Dickinsonia, Yorgia, Kimberella, Brachina, Parvancorina, Tribrachidium and others.

Taxonomy and relationships

Morphologically, Andiva most closely resembles Ovatoscutum, Chondroplon and, more distantly, Dickinsonia, as part of the proposed phylum Proarticulata. Archaeaspinus and Cyanorus have also been directly compared to it.

Jerzy Dzik includes Andiva in the Dipleurozoa, with Chondroplon as the closest relative, separated from Dickinsonia and closer to Yorgia, Praecambridium, Archaeaspinus and Vendia, since all of them are sharing a dextrally bent dorsal medial chamber.

See also
 List of Ediacaran genera

References

Cephalozoa
Prehistoric bilaterian genera
Monotypic prehistoric animal genera
Fossil taxa described in 2002
White Sea fossils
Ediacaran life
Fossils of Russia